Ayer Masin is a mukim in Pontian District, Johor, Malaysia.

Geography
The mukim spans over an area of 44 km2.

See also
 Geography of Malaysia

References

Mukims of Pontian District